This is a list of media in Regina, Saskatchewan, Canada.

Newspapers
 The Regina Leader was founded by Nicholas Flood Davin in 1883 and was the first Regina newspaper of record. Published weekly by the mercurial Davin, it came to national prominence during the trial of Louis Riel when Davin published several scoops and the Leader'''s articles were picked up by the national press. It merged with another local paper, the Regina Evening Post, and continued to publish daily editions of both before consolidating them under the title The Leader-Post. Other newspapers absorbed by The Leader-Post include the Regina Daily Star and The Province. It is now owned by Postmedia Network. The Regina Sun is published by the Leader-Post and distributed free of charge.Prairie Dog is a free newspaper produced by a Saskatchewan worker co-operative. It was launched in February 1993 as a monthly and has appeared every two weeks since October 1999. Prairie Dog is similar to alternative weeklies in other Canadian centres, such as Now (Toronto) and The Georgia Straight (Vancouver). In 2008, the Prairie Dog started a blog to get into web media.L'eau vive is a weekly newspaper established in 1971. The only French language newspaper in Saskatchewan, its offices are located in Regina; it serves the entire province's francophone community.Metro'' was a commuter newspaper that started distribution in Regina on April 2, 2012, but which ceased operations from November 26, 2014.

Radio

Television

Satellite and cable systems available in Regina provide access to a wide range of specialty networks and American broadcast stations.

Now-defunct broadcasters that once served Regina included CPN, a network of specialty cable channels (including HBO) that served Saskatchewan in the late 1970s, and Teletheatre, a pay network that aired movies and original programming in the 1980s (later bought out by what would eventually become Movie Central).

Internet
Regina had the largest free civic wireless internet program in Canada. The Downtown, Warehouse, 13th Avenue and University regions have government-sponsored wireless internet called Saskatchewan! Connected, which is also available in Saskatoon, Prince Albert and Moose Jaw.

Regina Saskatchewan! Connected was closed in September 2013

Notes

Regina
 
Media, Regina